Sjoerd Winkens (born 4 May 1983) is a Dutch former professional footballer who played as a left back. Winkens started his career with MVV Maastricht. He played two seasons for Helmond Sport, but he returned to MVV after two years. In June 2014, he retired from professional football.

References

External links
 Voetbal International profile 

1983 births
Living people
Dutch footballers
MVV Maastricht players
Helmond Sport players
Eerste Divisie players
People from Geleen
Association football defenders
Footballers from Limburg (Netherlands)